Grandpa Goes to Washington is an American comedy-drama television series that aired on NBC on Tuesday nights from September 7, 1978 to January 16, 1979. The series was very short-lived, as it was cancelled after a run of only 11 episodes. After Grandpa Goes to Washington's cancellation, no re-runs of the show have been aired by NBC, and it has also never seen a home media release.

Plot
The series centered on Joe Kelley, a political science teacher who was forced to retire when he turned 66, who then got himself elected to the U.S senate in spite of his not having any political experience. He won the election when the other candidates for office were tarnished by scandal. Kelley's style was unusual. He drove himself in an old Volkswagen (as opposed to being driven in a limousine), for relaxation he played the drums, and his earnest pledge was "Honesty in Government". He received his political information from former students, whom he considered his "friends in low places". His aim was to make the country a better place to live.

The senator lived with his son, Air Force General Kevin Kelley; Kevin's wife, Rosie; and their two children, Kathleen and Kevin, Jr. Joe thought Kevin was dull, bland and empty-headed (he called him, "My son, the Fathead'). Kevin tried to interfere with his father's position as a Senator, increasing the tension between them. Also seen was Madge, Joe's secretary, and Tony, Joe's aide. Another character was Patti who was played by comedian Patti Deutsch.

Cast
Jack Albertson as Senator Joe Kelley
Larry Linville as Maj. General Kevin Kelley
Sue Ane Langdon as Rosie Kelley
Sparky Marcus as Kevin Kelley Jr.
Michele Tobin as Kathleen Kelley
Tom Mason as Tony DeLuca
Madge Sinclair as Madge
Patti Deutsch as Patti
Scott Ellsworth as senator

Episode list

References

External links

1978 American television series debuts
1979 American television series endings
1970s American comedy-drama television series
1970s American political comedy television series
1970s American workplace comedy television series
NBC original programming
Television series about families
Television series by CBS Studios
Television shows set in Washington, D.C.
Television series about old age